Jean Mohamed Ben Abdeljlil, O.F.M. (alternative transcripts: Benabdeljlil or Abd al-Jalil, 1904 – 24 November 1979) was a Moroccan Catholic priest and a convert from Islam.

Biography

Mohamed Ben Abdeljlil was born in Fez, the spiritual city of Morocco, and begins by learning the Quran at the University of al-Karaouine and accompanied his parents at the age of 9 years old on a pilgrimage to Mecca. 

In 1922 he entered at Gouraud High School, where he graduated in 1925, while a resident of the Foucault school run by Franciscan fathers in Rabat. It was at this time that Mohamed developed an interest in Christian religion. Born into a family of Muslim notables of Fez, Mohamed Ben Abdejlil, who had made the Hajj to Mecca with his father, converted to Catholicism and was baptized on April 7, 1928 in the chapel of Franciscan college of Fontenay-sous-bois, taking the Christian name Jean, with sponsor of French orientalist Louis Massignon. This conversion caused at the time the sending to Paris of a confidential note from French intelligence services in Morocco, who feared the move would cause problems in the Protectorate. 

In 1929 Jean Abdejlil entered in the Franciscan Order. In 1930 he published anonymously in the journal En terre d’Islam, calls "offering the faithful to devote Friday to pray for our distant brothers", originally a "League for Friday prayers to the conversion of Muslims." Later, he also writes a "Novena for the conversion of Muslims". In 1935 Abdejlil was ordained a priest. 

In 1936 he was named professor at Catholic Institute of Paris. Abdejlil resigned in 1964, already hit by a tongue cancer and retired to the Saint Mary-Rose convent. In 1966 he was received by Pope Paul VI. 

He died on November 24, 1979.

Bibliography
 Borrmans Maurice, Jean-Mohammed Abd el-Jalil, Witness of the Qur'an and the Gospel, Paris, Editions du Cerf, 2005, .
 Francoise Jacquin (ed.), Massignon – Abdel Jalil: Godfather and godson. Correspondence, 1926–1962, Paris, Editions du Cerf, "History", 2007, .
 Alain Messaoudi, François Pouillon (ed.), "Dictionary of French Orientalist language" IISMM-Karthala, 2008, .
 Moroccan Vatican Jean Mohamed Ben Abdejlil (1904–1979), in MEH, Evangelicalism: Missionaries among us, The Gazette, Morocco, May 9, 2008.
 Dominique Avon, Recension of the book edited by Francoise Jacquin  [ archive ], Institute for the Study of Islam and Muslim societies (IEISM-EHESS), Paris, November 6, 2008.

References

External links
 https://web.archive.org/web/20120131090557/http://www.lagazettedumaroc.com/articles.php?id_artl=16896&n=576&r=2&sr=852
 http://www.franciscains-paris.org/articles.php?lng=fr&pg=24

1904 births
1979 deaths
Converts to Roman Catholicism from Islam
Moroccan Roman Catholics
Moroccan former Muslims
Franciscan missionaries
Date of birth missing
People from Fez, Morocco
20th-century Moroccan people